Caduff is a surname. Notable people with the surname include:

 Fabio Caduff (born 1985), Swiss snowboarder
 Giacun Caduff (born 1979), Swiss film director and producer
 Sylvia Caduff (born 1937), Swiss orchestral conductor